Suzan Ball (born Suzanne Ball; February 3, 1934 – August 5, 1955) was an American actress. She was a second cousin of fellow actress Lucille Ball. She was married to actor Richard Long. She had her leg amputated in January 1954, as a result of both a tumor and an accident she had. She died at age 21 of cancer in 1955, after a two-year battle.

Early life
Born in Jamestown, New York, Ball was the eldest daughter of Howard and Marleah Ball. Her family moved to North Hollywood in 1941. She graduated from North Hollywood High School with the class of summer 1951.

Personal life
Ball married Richard Long on April 4, 1954, at El Montecito Presbyterian Church in Santa Barbara. Many celebrities attended, including Jeff Chandler, Rock Hudson, Tony Curtis, Janet Leigh, and David Janssen.

Illness and death
In 1953, doctors diagnosed Ball with cancer when she developed tumors on her legs, forcing her to use crutches. Because of the cancer, doctors amputated one of her legs in 1954. She died in 1955 at the age of 21 at the City of Hope Hospital.

She is interred at Forest Lawn Memorial Park in Glendale, California.

Filmography

References

External links

1934 births
1955 deaths
20th-century American actresses
American amputees
Burials at Forest Lawn Memorial Park (Glendale)
People from Jamestown, New York
Actresses from New York (state)
North Hollywood High School alumni
 deaths from cancer in California